Henry M. Culley was an American tennis player active in the 1930s.

Tennis career
Culley reached the quarterfinals of the U.S. National Championships in 1936, defeating No. 5 seed and 1931 Wimbledon champion Sidney Wood en route.

References

External links 

American male tennis players
Year of birth missing
Year of death missing